The 2001 Arizona Cardinals season was the franchise’s 82nd year with the National Football League and the 14th season in Arizona. It was their final season in the NFC East division before moving to their current division, the NFC West.

Due to being the only team in the league with a Week 1 bye, the Cardinals were the final team to play their season opener, which was pushed back even further in wake of the September 11 attacks. Arizona did not play its opener until Sept. 23 vs. the Denver Broncos, the latest date an NFL team played its season opener since the 1960 Detroit Lions did not begin until October 2.

The 2001 Cardinals were also the most recent team in NFL history to have a Week 1 bye until the Tampa Bay Buccaneers and Miami Dolphins in 2017 due to Hurricane Irma. However, the 2001 Cardinals are the most recent NFL team to have a scheduled week 1 bye, a situation which will not occur again unless the NFL has an odd number of teams. 

The 2001 season was Pat Tillman’s final season as he left the NFL to join the U.S. Army following the season.

Offseason

NFL Draft

Undrafted free agents

Personnel

Staff

Roster

Regular season

Schedule 

Note: Intra-division opponents are in bold text.

Standings

References

External links 
 2001 Arizona Cardinals at Pro-Football-Reference.com

Arizona
Arizona Cardinals seasons
Arizona